AC, A.C. or Ac often refers to:
 Air conditioning 
 Alternating current, a type of electrical current in which the current repeatedly changes direction

AC, A.C. or Ac may also refer to:

Arts and entertainment

Gaming
 Ace Combat, a series of combat flight simulator games
 Armor Class, a combat-related parameter in the Dungeons & Dragons role playing game system
 Armored Core, a series of mecha-based third person shooter games
 Asheron's Call, a fantasy massively multiplayer online role-playing game
 Assassin's Creed, a series of action-adventure games
 Assetto Corsa, a racing simulator game
 Astral Chain, an action-adventure hack and slash game
 Animal Crossing, a series of community simulation games
 A.C., a character in Fortnite: Save the World

Music
 A.C. Newman, solo stage name for Canadian musician Carl Newman
 AC/DC, an Australian rock band formed in Sydney in 1973
 Adult contemporary music, a genre description used mainly in radio broadcasting
 Adult Contemporary (chart)
 Anal Cunt, an American musical group

Other media
 AC Comics, a comic book publisher established in 1969
 A.C. Slater, a fictional character in the American sitcom Saved by the Bell
 After Colony, an alternate timeline in the Gundam metaseries for the universe of Gundam Wing
 AC, the name of the "ultimate computer" in Isaac Asimov's novel The Last Question
 Asianovela Channel, a defunct Filipino TV channel

Organizations

Businesses
 AC Cars, a British specialist automobile manufacturer
 AC Spark Plug, Delco, AC-Delco, and ACDelco, automotive parts brands owned by General Motors
 AC Restaurants, a hotel and restaurant chain in the Benelux
 Air Canada, the flag carrier and largest airline of Canada (IATA code AC)
 Allis-Chalmers, a former industrial conglomerate
 Associated Content, an online publisher and distributor of original content
 Ayala Corporation, a holding company (Philippine Stock Exchange symbol AC)

Politics
 Action Congress, a political party in Nigeria
 Advisory Council on Youth, a non-governmental decision-making body in the Council of Europe.
 Alternative for Change (Alternativa por el Cambio), a political party in Nicaragua
 Coast Alliance (Alianza Costeña), a former regional political coalition in Nicaragua

Other organizations
 AC – The Danish Confederation of Professional Associations, an umbrella organisation for several Danish trade unions
 AC Transit, a regional public transit agency in the San Francisco Bay Area
 Ad Council Japan (AC Japan), an organization that distributes Japanese public service announcements
 Athletics Canada, the governing body of athletics in Canada
 Civic Alliance Foundation (Alianţa Civică), a Romanian non-governmental organization
 Anthrocon, the second largest furry convention in the world, held in Pittsburgh, Pennsylvania, US
 Audit Commission (Hong Kong), a government department in Hong Kong Special Administrative Region
 Aryan Circle, a white supremacist, Neo-Nazi prison gang spread throughout many U.S. correctional facilities

People
 AC Bonifacio, a Philippine-Canadian actress, singer and dancer
 A. C. Green, retired professional basketball player
 A. C. Grayling, British philosopher
 Al Cowlings, retired American football player

Places
 .ac, Internet top-level domain name for Ascension Island
 Aachen, a spa town in North Rhine-Westphalia, Germany
 Acre (state), Brazil
 Aleksandrovac, Serbia (vehicle registration plate code AC)
 Atlantic City, New Jersey, US

Ranks, titles, and awards
 Aelod y Cynulliad, title for Members of the National Assembly for Wales
 Aircraftman, an air forces rank
 Ashoka Chakra (military decoration), India's highest peacetime military decoration
 Assistant Commissioner of Police of the Metropolis, a rank in London's Metropolitan Police
 Companion of the Order of Australia
 First assistant camera or Second assistant camera, in film-making

Science and technology

Biology and medicine 
 Acromioclavicular joint (AC joint), the shoulder junction between the scapula and the clavicle 
 Adenylate cyclase, a lyase enzyme
 Adriamycin and cyclophosphamide, a chemotherapy regimen used to treat breast cancer
 Ante cibum (ac), Latin for "before meal", commonly seen in medical prescriptions
 Anterior commissure, a bundle of nerve fibers connecting the two temporal lobes of the brain
 Anterior cruciate ligament (AC ligament or ACL), a major ligament in the knee
 Appropriateness criteria, when it is appropriate to perform a medical procedure or service
 Assist control, a former term for continuous mandatory ventilation, a mode of mechanical ventilation
Adenocarcinoma, a type of cancerous tumor
Allergic conjunctivitis, inflammation of the conjunctiva

Chemistry
 Acetyl, a functional group in chemistry
 Actinium, symbol Ac, a chemical element
 Hydrogen cyanide, also called as AC in chemical weapon term

Computing and telecommunications
 .ac, Internet top-level domain name for Ascension Island
 .ac (second-level domain), Internet second-level domain used to denote academic institutions in many countries
 AC (complexity), a hierarchy of complexity classes found in circuit complexity
 AC, initialism of access control
 Artificial consciousness, a field related to artificial intelligence and cognitive robotics
 Authorization certificate or attribute certificate, a digital permission to use a service or resource
 Arithmetic coding, a form of entropy encoding used in lossless data compression
 alternating component a.k.a. AC coefficient in discrete cosine transform
 IEEE 802.11ac, a wifi standard using 5GHz, released in Dec 2013

Meteorology
 Altocumulus, a medium level cloud type
 Anticipated convection, convective outlooks issued by the U.S. National Weather Service

Other uses in science and technology
 Air conditioning, technologies for altering the temperature and humidity of air
 Across corners (A/C), a measure of external diameter of hexagonal nuts
 Alternating current, a type of electric current
 AC power, a net transfer of energy over a complete cycle of the alternating current waveform
 Asphalt concrete, a type of road or path surfacing
 Average cost, in economics
 Axiom of choice, a mathematical concept in set theory

Other uses 
 Ac (rune) (ᚪ), a rune of the Anglo-Saxon fuþorc and a continuation of the Elder Fuþark ansuz
 A.C. Milan, an Italian football club based in the city of Milan
 Acre, a unit of area with the symbol ac
 Advisory circular, a publication to provide guidance for compliance with airworthiness regulations
 Ante Christum or A.C., a Latin term meaning "before Christ"
 Antichrist, a Biblical prophecy about one who will oppose Jesus Christ and substitute himself in Christ's place
 Appeal Cases, or A.C., a UK law reporter covering decisions of the House of Lords, Supreme Court, Privy Council, and Court of Appeal
 Armor Class, a common property in role playing games used to determine the amount of armor a character has
 Army Corps, an operational formation, sometimes known as a field corps, which consists of two or more divisions
 Atlantic College, an international IB Diploma Programme residential Sixth Form College in the Vale of Glamorgan in Wales
 Auto Calesa, a war-time short-body version of the Philippine jeepney

See also

 
 
 AC/DC (disambiguation)